Eurostars Hotels is a hotel chain based in Barcelona, Spain, fully owned by The Hotusa Group. At mid of 2019, Eurostars Hotels comprised 104 hotels in 13 countries worldwide.

History 

Eurostars Hotels was formed in 2005 by the Barcelona-based Hotusa Group to provide accommodation for travelers to and within Europe. The company quickly grew beyond Europe to Mexico, Argentina and purchased two four-star boutique hotels in New York City.

In April 2007, Eurostars Hotels acquired the Dylan Hotel in New York. In July 2008, the group purchased a minority stake in a hotel in Venice, the Residenza Cannaregio. In January 2009, Eurostars opened a 31-floor hotel in the Torre Sacyr Vallehermoso in Madrid, its second location in the city. In December 2010, Eurostars opened its 100th directly managed hotel in the San Lázaro area of Santiago de Compostela

In April 2011, Eurostars Hotels launched a 5-star location in Berlin. In July 2016, Eurostars opened its first hotel in Africa, in Morocco. In October 2016, Eurostars Hotels launched in Colombia and in Ecuador in October 2017.

In March 2019, Eurostars Hotels tested the presence of a robot in a hotel lobby in Barcelona (Eurostars Grand Marina) that greets customers and caters to their needs. In October 2019, Hotusa acquired the Langford Hotel in Miami and turned it into a Eurostars Hotel.

Description 

Eurostars Hotels is a chain of hotels based in Barcelona, Spain, and owned by the hospitality group Hotusa.

References

External links 
 Eurostars Hotels
 Hotusa Group

Hotel chains in Spain
Hospitality companies of Spain
Companies based in Barcelona